Vasantrao Uike was an Indian politician from the state of Madhya Pradesh.
He represented Lakhnadon Vidhan Sabha constituency in the Madhya Pradesh Legislative Assembly from 1957 to 1962.

References 

People from Madhya Pradesh
Madhya Pradesh MLAs 1957–1962
People from Bhandara district
Year of birth missing
Year of death missing
Indian National Congress politicians from Madhya Pradesh